Marian Standowicz (born 3 December 1955) is a Polish judoka. He competed in the men's lightweight event at the 1976 Summer Olympics.

References

1955 births
Living people
Polish male judoka
Olympic judoka of Poland
Judoka at the 1976 Summer Olympics
People from Koszalin